Siobhan Karam (born May 1, 1986) is a Canadian former competitive ice dancer. She competed for two years with Kevin O'Keefe, with whom she teamed up in May 2007. They placed 4th at the 2007 Ondrej Nepela Memorial and 6th at the 2008 Canadian Figure Skating Championships.

Karam previously competed with Joshua McGrath. They were the 2005 Canadian junior national champion. They came 7th at the 2005 World Junior Figure Skating Championships and competed on both the Junior Grand Prix and the senior ISU Grand Prix of Figure Skating. They were teamed up in 1997 by Marina Zoueva and their partnership ended in 2007 when McGrath retired from skating.

References

External links
 Karam & O'Keefe official site
 
 

Canadian female ice dancers
1986 births
Living people
Sportspeople from Ottawa